Annie Up is the second studio album by American country girl group Pistol Annies, but this is the first album with RCA Nashville. The group consists of Miranda Lambert, Ashley Monroe and Angaleena Presley. Annie Up started with 83,000 albums sold in the first week.

The vinyl LP version of the record was pressed by United Record Pressing in Nashville, TN.

Critical reception

Annie Up has received almost universally positive reviews and ratings from music critics. At Metacritic, which assigns a weighted average score out of 100 to reviews and ratings from mainstream critics, the album received a score of 87, based on 11 reviews. Stephen Thomas Erlewine of AllMusic called it a "thoroughly integrated effort; the work of a group, not three individuals" that has a "bruised, beautiful richness." At MSN Music's Expert Witness blog, Robert Christgau highlighted how "a lark evolves into a business proposition as an album of 10 inspired three-minute songs eventuates in an album of 12 expert three-and-a-half-minute songs." At Nash Country Weekly, Jon Freeman found that this album even more so than its predecessor has "more engaging studies of real-life heartbreak, domestic inertia and the daily trials of womanhood."

Kyle Anderson of Entertainment Weekly alluded to that the release "is a more fully formed take on Southern sisterhood." At Los Angeles Times, Randy Lewis evoked that "their switchblade-sharp vision incorporates acute observational powers about the human condition and savvy compositional skills that come together in songs that are piercingly honest, funny and sometimes both." In addition, Lewis said that "mostly it feels like eavesdropping on one helluva lively girls night out." Rob Burkhardt of Music Is My Oxygen Weekly told that the release "doesn’t take this popularity for granted; instead, it wisely spends the political capital", and that is because it "has enough sex appeal to keep the men interested, a deeper look reveals that it is really an album by women, for women." At Rolling Stone, Jody Rosen affirmed that like the predecessor the work is "full of attitude and guffaws, delivered in three-part harmony over down-home country", and found that the trio "drop the 'tude altogether for a love song as poignant as the rest is fun." Roughstock's Matt Bjorke wrote that the effort "is the work of a band and is clearly no side project for any of the band's members."

At The Salt Lake Tribune, David Burger called it a "bluegrass-inspired collection is nothing short of entertaining, even when the women complain non-stop about the men in their lives." Annie Galvin of Slant Magazine highlighted that "Annie Up doesn't quite break the country genre's familiar format, it's a hell of a lot of fun, and one could do worse than spend 40 minutes with these sassy almost-outlaws." Taste of Country's Billy Dukes stated that Pistol Annies "make strides with the arrangements and production on 'Annie Up,' but the stories aren't as sharp and the messages aren't nearly as emotional." At USA Today, Elysa Gardner found that "the clichés are far less striking than the trio's gritty-sweet harmonies, taut musicianship and genuine pluck."

Track listing

Personnel

Pistol Annies
 Miranda Lambert - lead vocals, background vocals
 Ashley Monroe - lead vocals, background vocals
 Angaleena Presley - lead vocals, background vocals

Additional Musicians
 Eric Darken - percussion
 Fred Eltringham - drums, finger snaps, percussion
 Steve Fishell - steel guitar, lap steel guitar
 Randy Scruggs - acoustic slide guitar, banjo, acoustic guitar, electric guitar, mandolin
 Guthrie Trapp - electric guitar, mandolin
 Bobby Wood - Hammond B-3 organ, piano
 Glenn Worf - bass guitar, upright bass, slide bass, Wurlitzer

Chart performance

Album
Sales 221,145 (US Only)

Year-end charts

Singles

References

2013 albums
RCA Records albums
Pistol Annies albums
Albums produced by Frank Liddell
Albums produced by Chuck Ainlay